The Black Black is Solace's fifth studio recording.  Referred to as "the distillation of thirty years of metal"  and "the best material Solace has written", "The Black Black" was recorded at New Jersey's Trax East Studios over the course of a year.  The album was compiled from tracks originally recorded for Solace's forthcoming album A.D.  When the band realized that they simply had too much material for a single album, they removed four tracks for this EP.

Released on both CD and limited edition vinyl, both versions sport front cover art by Solace friend and repeat cover-artist Paul Vismara, while the CD version features interior and back cover photography by Penelope Pappas.

Track listing

"Khan (World of Fire)"
"Destroy the Gift"
"The Devil's Clock"
"World War" (The Cure cover)

Lineup

Tommy Southard: Guitars
Justin Daniels: Guitars
Jason: Vocals, Lyrics
Rob Hultz: Bass
Kenny Lund: Drums

References 

Solace (band) albums
2007 albums